Carlos Pizarro Leongómez (6 June 1951 – 26 April 1990) was the fourth commander of the Colombian guerrilla group 19th of April Movement (Movimiento 19 de Abril) (M-19). Pizarro later ran for president of Colombia after the demobilization of M-19 that transformed the group into the political party, M-19 Democratic Alliance (Alianza Democrática M-19) (AD/M-19). Pizarro was assassinated on 26 April 1990.

Early years
He was the son of navy admiral Juan Antonio Pizarro and Margot Leongómez Matamoros. Admiral Pizarro had been appointed general commander of the Colombian Navy during the administration of Gustavo Rojas Pinilla, and was later appointed as military attaché at the Colombian Embassy in the United States and national representative to the Inter-American Defense Board, so the whole family moved to live in Washington, DC. Upon their return to Colombia, and following the retirement of his father from active duty in 1959, they settled in the city of Cali. Pizarro studied in several high schools and a boarding school in Bogotá, where he graduated as Bachelor.

He was admitted later in 1967 in the faculty of Law of the Jesuit Pontifical Xavierian University where two of his brothers were also studying law. There, Pizarro started becoming involved in political student activism which had become a worldwide phenomenon following the events of May 1968. Pizarro was involved in the organization of the only student strike of the university, and soon joined the Juventud Comunista Colombiana (JUCO, Colombian Communist Youth). As a result of his activism he and others in the movement, including his brother Eduardo were expelled from the University. Later Pizarro-Leongomez entered the National University of Colombia, where he continued his studies in Law and participated in political left-wing activism with JUCO.

The M-19
By this time, the Revolutionary Armed Forces of Colombia (Fuerzas Armadas Revolucionarias de Colombia, FARC) guerrilla had been growing in power and influence and had adopted a communist ideology after having started as a liberal movement. The leaders of the FARC started thinking of switching strategies and bringing the armed conflict to the big cities, and members like Jaime Batemán Cayon started working on the organization of an urban guerrilla movement, and to do so started to recruit the young members of the JUCO. Pizarro was among those who were contacted by the guerrilla, and following these early contacts an 18 year old Pizarro decided to move to the countryside without completing his degree to engage in social work in the zones marked by the political violence that had occurred during and after the La Violencia period, and which were under the control of communists who had been liberals during the time, including the regions of Puerto Boyacá and Yacopí. Around this time he finally made the decision to enlist in the Revolutionary Armed Forces of Colombia (Fuerzas Armadas Revolucionarias de Colombia, FARC) in 1972 at the age of 18. This was not an uncommon decision during the time, and there he joined many of his future comrades in the M-19 like Jaime Batemán Cayon and Álvaro Fayad. During these days the guerrilla soldiers were essentially armed farmers and their economic support came for their growing crops to sell, with interspersed combats with the army. During this period Pizarro's seizures caused by disrhytmia worsened.

Pizarro and the young and few members of the urban front started to have confrontations with the traditional leaders of FARC who mostly disregarded them, and resented their views. Following the death by gun squad of a fellow urban guerrilla Luis Alfonso Gil Ospina for contravening the orders of his guerrilla superiors, and the discontent with the hierarchies and rigidization of the FARC, Pizarro decided to desert FARC on September 11, 1973, the very day of the death of Salvador Allende. Back in the city he reestablished his contact with his old friend Jaime Bateman, Álvaro Fayad "the Turk", Luis Otero Cifuentes, Vera Grabe, Iván Marino Ospina and others. Bateman had been working towards an urban guerrilla movement since his days at the FARC, and together they founded the April 19 Movement (M-19), at the end of 1973.

The M-19 was an urban, nationalistic, Bolivarian, and social democratic guerrilla group. Following a media campaign that involved graffiti and enigmatic messages on newspapers, the M-19 conducted their first action on 17 January 1974, by stealing the sword of Simón Bolívar from the Quinta de Bolívar. The sword became the symbol of the guerrillas' fight under the slogan of "Bolivar your sword returns to the fight".

Arrest and amnesty
In 1979 Pizarro was detected in Santander, after a crude attack of the army. He and several companions were taken to a military base where they were tortured.

Soon they transferred to the jail of La Picota of Bogotá, where other guerrillas were being held. He remained in jail for three years. He and his companions were freed in 1982 at the beginning of the government of Belisario Betancur after being approved by absolute majority in the Congress under an amnesty law.

After the amnesty, Pizarro continued his guerrilla activities insisting that the government establish a dialogue of peace.

Failed peace process

On 24 August 1984 the sign of the Agreements of Corinto, after an attack that suffered during an ambush of the army (next to other made its companion Iván Marino Ospina) he got hurt next to its companion. In spite of the intention to lay down the arms, Pizarro ordered new battles against the army after they also attacked his main amnestied heads or in truce and the camping in truce in Yarumales.

At the beginning of 1985 in quality of supreme commander, Pizarro announces defeat the truce and the resumption of operations of the guerrilla. On 6 November of that same year, Alvaro Fayad orders the taking of the Palace of Justice in Bogotá kidnapping to the magistrates of the high courts, the objective of the taking was the judgment of the president to fail to fulfill the Agreements of Corinto. The government ignoring the requests of the group orders the army to attack the building, without surviving the guerrillas nor the hostages who requested ceasefire and the respect to the life.

M-19 leadership

"America" Battalion and CNG
Pizarro became commander of M-19 in 1986, following the Palace of Justice siege. Prior to 1986, Pizarro was the movement's military commander and often credited with moving the group in a more militant direction. In January 1986, from the Cauca Andes mountains, Pizarro announced the organization of the "America" Battalion which was composed of fighters from the National Guerrilla Coordinating Group (Coordinadora Nacional Guerrillera) (CNG) and foreign fighters from other Latin American countries.

The "America" Battalion was to operate much like the CNG, but on an international level that would include fighters from all over Latin America. The group, however, was unable to operate and consolidate due to deportation of suspicious foreigners in the Cauca Department. The group's victories included the seizure of neighboring areas such as Belalcázar in August 1986 and Inza in September 1986.

AD/M-19 formation and death

After 19 years in operation, the group, commanded by Pizarro, began negotiating with the Colombian government, in April 1989, for demobilization conditional on certain grounds. The primary request of the group was a full pardon for all prior activities as well as the right to form a political party. M-19 in return agreed to turn over all weapons and not to return to violent activities, the demobilization date was set for mid-December 1989. The accord was signed in the town of Santo Domingo by Jaime Pardo Rueda, adviser to the president, Raul Orejuela Bueno, Minister of Interior and Pizarro, Commander of M-19.

Following the signing of the accord, M-19 announced Pizarro would officially run as the group's presidential nominee in the 1990 elections. He was assassinated shortly thereafter aboard an Avianca Airlines Boeing 727 plane flying from Bogotá to Barranquilla on April 26, 1990, by a young paramilitary member named Gerardo Gutierrez Uribe, aka "Jerry". Gutierrez Uribe himself was shot dead by Pizarro's security detail during the shoot-out. During the 1990 presidential campaign, three candidates were assassinated: Luis Carlos Galán, the leading Liberal candidate, Bernardo Jaramillo Ossa for the political party Unión Patriótica (UP), and Pizarro. Following the assassination, Antonio Navarro Wolff accepted the nomination of AD/M-19; he later finished third with 12.7% of the vote, losing out to César Gaviria who subsequently appointed him health minister.

Chief Prosecutor Alfonso Gomez would later charge Carlos Castaño, former leader of the United Self-Defense Forces of Colombia (AUC), for the deaths of Jaramillo Ossa and Pizarro on May 24, 1999.

Personal life
Pizarro had a daughter, María José Pizarro, with Myrian Rodríguez in 1978. She compiled his letters and photographs in the 2015 book De su puño y letra, and later became a member of the Colombian Chamber of Representatives and Senate.

Popular culture
 Carlos Pizarro is portrayed by actor Tiberio Cruz in the Colombian TV series Escobar, el patrón del mal as the character Diego Pizano.
 In the TV series Tres Caínes, Pizarro is portrayed by Rashed Steffen as the character César Navarro.

See also
19th of April Movement
History of Colombia
Palace of Justice siege
Politics of Colombia

References

1951 births
1990 deaths
People from Cartagena, Colombia
Colombian rebels
19th of April Movement members
Assassinated Colombian politicians
Deaths by firearm in Colombia
People murdered in Colombia
Burials at Central Cemetery of Bogotá
Colombian politicians